Youssef Safri (born 3 January 1977) is a Moroccan football coach and former player who is coach for Qatar SC.

Club career
Safri started his youth career at Rachad Bernoussi. The following year, he was promoted to the senior squad. He was a midfielder best known for his passing and tackling ability.

In 2001, he joined Coventry City where he played until 2004, scoring once against Sheffield Wednesday. In December 2003, he had come under fire after breaking the leg of Sunderland player Colin Healy. The next season, he joined Norwich City for an initial fee of £500,000 in the summer of 2004, after the Canaries had been promoted to the Premier League.

Safri became popular among the Norwich fans towards the end of the 2004–05 campaign and during the 2005–06 season following a series of impressive performances. He scored a 40-yard strike against Newcastle United in April 2005 during the team's fight against relegation from the Premiership. Safri was linked with a move to Feyenoord in the summer of 2005, but stayed at Carrow Road.

Following the 3–1 defeat at Plymouth Argyle in September 2006, Safri and teammate Dickson Etuhu were reported to have traded punches on the team bus during their return journey to East Anglia, although these reports are now thought to have been discredited. After Peter Grant was appointed Norwich manager in October 2006, Safri was not a regular selection. There was speculation that he would leave the club in January 2007, fuelled by his comments in the Eastern Daily Press on 29 December 2006 in which Safri indicated that he would seek a transfer if Grant continued to use him as a substitute. Safri remained at Carrow Road until the end of the 2006–07 season, but after falling out with manager Peter Grant, Grant stated in the press on 1 August that Safri would not play for the club again.

On 2 August 2007 he signed for Norwich's championship rivals Southampton on a two-year contract for a fee rumoured to be of the order of £250,000. On 24 October 2007 he was sent off in the 90th minute of Southampton's away defeat to Bristol City, for a heavy tackle on Lee Johnson, whose subsequent reaction to Safri pushing him by all accounts was exaggerated, resulting in a straight Red.

On 7 July 2008 he joined Qatar Sports Club in a £300,000 transfer.

International career
Safri was a key player with the Moroccan national team during the 2004 African Nations Cup, and was a member of the national squad competing at 1997 FIFA World Youth Championship, the 2000 Summer Olympics in Sydney. Safri qualified to play for Scotland through a maternal grandparent, but decided to play for his native Morocco, stating concerns about the Scottish weather.

Coaching career
At the end of 2013 season he retired and started a role of assisting coach in his first club Raja CA. In the following 2015–16 season, he was assistant manager of Jamal Sellami at Difaâ Hassani El Jadidi.

In May 2018, Safri returned to Raja, again as assistant manager, this time under manager Juan Carlos Garrido. Garrido was sacked on 28 January 2019, and Safri was appointed caretaker manager. It lasted for two days, before Patrice Carteron was appointed. Safri however, left the club on 12 June 2019. In November 2019, Safri returned to Raja CA. Coached Islam Under-17s to a league title in 2017-18 and won Manager of the season.

Honours
Raja CA
Moroccan League: 1998, 1999, 2000, 2001
CAF Champions League: 1999
CAF Super Cup: 2000

Qatar SC
Qatar Crown Prince Cup: 2009

Morocco
Africa Cup of Nations runner-up:2004

References

External links
Youssef Safri player profile at saintsfc.co.uk
Youssef Safri player profile at canaries.co.uk

BBC Sport – Safri signs for Southampton

1977 births
Living people
Moroccan footballers
Footballers from Casablanca
Morocco under-20 international footballers
Morocco international footballers
2002 African Cup of Nations players
2004 African Cup of Nations players
2006 Africa Cup of Nations players
2008 Africa Cup of Nations players
Expatriate footballers in England
Expatriate footballers in Qatar
Moroccan Muslims
Moroccan emigrants to the United Kingdom
Moroccan expatriate footballers
Moroccan expatriate sportspeople in England
Moroccan expatriate sportspeople in Qatar
Raja CA players
Coventry City F.C. players
Norwich City F.C. players
Olympic footballers of Morocco
Footballers at the 2000 Summer Olympics
Premier League players
Qatar SC players
Qatar Stars League players
Association football midfielders
Raja CA managers
Moroccan expatriate football managers